A melanocratic rock contains at least 60% dark and heavy ferro-magnesium minerals.

References

Petrology